Huffamoose is the debut album by alternative rock band Huffamoose. It was released in 1995 on 7 Records.

Track listing

References

1995 debut albums
Huffamoose albums